Pape Ousseynou Sy (born April 5, 1988) is a French professional basketball player who last played for BCM Gravelines of the LNB Pro A. A versatile guard/forward, Sy was drafted by the Hawks as the 53rd overall pick in the second round of the 2010 NBA draft after spending five seasons with STB Le Havre.

Biography
Pape Sy was born in Loudéac, a small town in north-western France to a Senegalese family. He learned to play basketball in a local  club. Sy later moved to Massy before joining Le Havre's youth club in 2004 at the age of 16. While playing in France, Sy was recruited by the University of Wyoming men's basketball coach Fred Langley.

Sy's older sister, Penda Sy, was a professional basketball player in Europe.

Professional career

STB Le Havre (2005–2010)
Sy joined the French team STB Le Havre in 2005. In 2009–10, his last season with Le Havre, Sy averaged 5.2 points, 1.7 rebounds and 1.3 assists in just over 14 minutes per game.

Atlanta Hawks/Utah Flash (2010–2011)
Sy paid his own way to come to the United States to showcase his talent for NBA teams. Only the Atlanta Hawks agreed to allow him to work out for them and was the 53rd selection in the 2010 NBA draft. In the Las Vegas Summer League, Sy averaged 4.5 points per game in 8 minutes per game and exhibiting his defensive prowess. On September 15, 2010, Sy signed a three-year contract with the Hawks, with the first year guaranteed at $473,604.

Sy began his rookie season beset with injury, suffering an Achilles injury during summer league. He subsequently missed all of training camp due to a bad back and was listed on the injury report for the first 18 games of the regular season before being cleared to practice. On December 27, 2010, the Hawks sent Sy to the Utah Flash of the NBA Development League.

Sy made his debut for the Flash on January 2, 2011 in a 99–83 loss the Bakersfield Jam. Sy notched six points, three assists and three rebounds in 25 minutes off the bench. On January 30, 2011, in a game against the Austin Toros, Sy had his best game to date with the Flash, notching 22 points, 2 rebounds, and 1 assist in 26 minutes.

On March 2, 2011, it was announced that Sy would return to the Hawks for the remainder of the 2010–11 season. Sy made his NBA debut against the Indiana Pacers on April 8, 2011. He recorded a steal and a foul in 3 minutes.

On December 23, 2011, Sy was cut from the Atlanta Hawks.

France (2011–present)
In August 2011, during the 2011 NBA lockout, Sy signed with BCM Gravelines in France. His deal had an out-clause that would allow him to return to the NBA when the lockout ended. However, after he was cut by the Hawks during the pre-season, Sy re-signed with Gravelines on January 3, 2012.

On June 27, 2012, Sy signed a two-year deal with Le Mans Sarthe Basket of France.

On May 21, 2014, he returned to BCM Gravelines signing a three-year contract. After two seasons he left Gravelines.

On July 10, 2016, Sy signed a two-year contract with SIG Strasbourg.

National team career
Sy was a member of the ninth-place French squad at the 2009 FIBA Europe Under-20 Championship. Though Sy appeared in every game, he ended up just 10th in minutes played for France, with averages of 2.0 points, 0.6 assists, 0.9 rebounds and 10.4 minutes in eight games.

Statistics

Ligue Nationale de Basketball

Regular season

|-
| align="left" | 2007–08
| align="left" | Le Havre
| 7 || 0 || 4.9 || .50 || .33 || .50 || 0.4 || 0.3 || 0.4 || 0.0 || 2.4
|-
| align="left" | 2008–09
| align="left" | Le Havre
| 1 || 0 || 2.0 || .00 || .00 || .00 || 0.0 || 0.0 || 0.0 || 0.0 || 0.0
|-
| align="left" | 2009–10
| align="left" | Le Havre
| 30 || 0 || 14.2 || .55 || .41 || .71 || 1.7 || 1.3 || 0.6 || 0.1 || 5.2
|-

NBA D-League

Regular season

|-
| align="left" | 2010–11
| align="left" | Utah
| 23 || 11 || 22.1 || .424 || .150 || .737 || 3.4 || 1.3 || 0.3 || 0.04 || 8.0
|-
| align="left" | Career
| align="left" |
| 23 || 11 || 22.1 || .424 || .150 || .737 || 3.4 || 1.3 || 0.3 || 0.04 || 8.0

NBA career statistics

Regular season 

|-
| align="left" | 
| align="left" | Atlanta
| 3 || 0 || 7.0 || .333 || .000 || 1.000 || 1.0 || .7 || .3 || - || 2.3
|-
| align="left" | Career
| align="left" |
| 3 || 0 || 7.0 || .333 || .000 || 1.000 || 1.0 || .7 || .3 || - || 2.3

Playoffs 

|-
| align="left" | 2011
| align="left" | Atlanta
| 4 || 0 || 2.8 || .667 || .000 || .500 || .3 || .8 || .3 || - || 1.5
|-
| align="left" | Career
| align="left" |
| 4 || 0 || 2.8 || .667 || .000 || .500 || .3 || .8 || .3 || - || 1.5

See also 

List of European basketball players in the United States

References

External links
NBADraft.net profile
NBA.com Profile 
FIBA.com Profile

1988 births
Living people
Atlanta Hawks draft picks
Atlanta Hawks players
BCM Gravelines players
Black French sportspeople
Cholet Basket players
French expatriate basketball people in the United States
French men's basketball players
French sportspeople of Senegalese descent
Le Mans Sarthe Basket players
National Basketball Association players from France
People from Loudéac
People from Massy, Essonne
Shooting guards
SIG Basket players
Small forwards
Sportspeople from Côtes-d'Armor
Sportspeople from Essonne
STB Le Havre players
Utah Flash players